is a Japanese cooking technique in which various foods—most often chicken, but also other meat and fish—are deep fried in oil. The process involves lightly coating small pieces of the meat or fish with a combination of flour and potato starch or corn starch, and frying in a light oil. The foods are marinated prior to coating. The process differs from the preparation of tempura, which is not marinated and uses a batter for coating. Karaage is often served alone or with rice and shredded cabbage.

When the main ingredient is coated with starch instead of flour, the dish may be called (竜田揚げ).

History 
The first references to a style of frying called  (then written as ) were in the Genroku period at the end of the 17th century. Chicken  was popularized as a "Chinese-style" restaurant food (using the characters ) in the 1930s.

When used without a modifier,  usually refers to the chicken version of the dish; this has been the most common application of the cooking style since making  at home became more popular after World War II. Chicken  is commonly available in convenience stores such as Lawson, FamilyMart, and 7-Eleven as a fast food item. It is also readily available in food stands throughout Japan. At the annual  Festival in the city of Oita, over 60 different shops participate to provide unique versions of the dish.

in the media 
 has been embedded into Japanese cuisine and has made several TV appearances. Probably the most notable appearance has been in the anime/manga series Shokugeki no Souma, a show about a young aspiring chef who sticks to his roots in family restaurant food.

Another notable mention was by Anthony Bourdain. Bourdain sang praises for the Japanese fried dish in an interview, saying that he always stopped by Lawson to pick up  when he visited Japan.

The dish of the Japan Air Self-Defense Force is deep-fried chicken , such as Okinawan-style deep-fried chicken. It has been used to promote the JASDF.

Regional  

Since  has spread throughout Japan, there have been many regional takes on the dish, the most notable ones including:

Gurukun is Okinawa's official and most popular fish, often called a "banana fish" in English; it is a fish fried whole and served with lemon. 

  – A version of  popular in Yamaguchi prefecture. Shimonoseki is known as the capital of fugu and many restaurants serving fugu  can be found around the city. The flesh, organs, and bones of the blowfish are deep-fried.

See also

 Fried chicken
 List of cooking techniques
 List of deep fried foods
 Tempura

References

External links

 Japan Karaage Association 
 Karaage JP 
 Photos and further info about karaage 
 Chicken Karaage recipe video (in English)

Japanese cuisine
Japanese Chinese cuisine
Deep fried foods
Fried chicken